Ananda College is a prominent Buddhist school in Maradana, Colombo. It was established as the English Buddhist School by Colonel Henry Steel Olcott in 1886.

Early history 
Following a meeting of Buddhists at Pettah, under the patronage of Hikkaduwe Sri Sumangala Thera, an English-Buddhist school was inaugurated at 19 Prince Street on 1 November 1886 by the Buddhist Theosophical Society. The first session was attended by 37 students. In 1888, when about 130 boys were attending, it moved to 61 Maliban Street. C. W. Leadbeater was appointed the first principal of Ananda today.

By the time the school was officially registered in March 1889, there were 120 students. That same year, J. P. R. Weerasuriya became the first Anandian to pass the Cambridge junior examination. The Cambridge graduate and confessed Buddhist A. E. Bultjens became principal.

In March 1890, the school's proximity to a Catholic school led to controversy—and a move to 54 Maliban Street where further growth ensued, and student enrollments rose to 200 in September 1892 and 270 in 1894. As principals followed Don Baron Jayatilaka. That year, Mr. Tudor Rajapaksha donated  of land and the school was relocated in the suburb of Maradana. On 17 August 1895, the former English Buddhist School was renamed to Ananda College Colombo with R. A. Mirando serving as its manager till his death during the 1915 riots.

When Patrick de Silva Kularatne took over in 1918 attendance was 450 which rapidly increased to 1000 two years later. At this time the annual budget was 80000 Rs.

By 1961, the college had officially become a government school.

Ananda Viharaya 
The Ananda Viharaya is the most easily distinguishable edifice and heart of the college.

Completed under Col. E. A. Perusinghe, Late Governor, Honourable William Gopallawa handed over the Viharaya to the School on 6 March 1969. The Buddha statue has been designed by Venerable Kalasoori Mapalagama Vipulasara Thero.

"Battle of the Maroons"

In a tradition dating back to 1924, an annual cricket contest is held between Ananda College and Nalanda College Colombo. The two schools have contributed many players to the Sri Lanka national cricket team, including the old Anandians Sidath Wettimuny recipient of Wisden Cricketers of the Year in 1985, Arjuna Ranatunga (who captained the Sri Lanka Cricket team to victory in the 1996 Cricket World Cup and who was also named as a Wisden Cricketers of the Year in 1999), former mod captain Marvan Atapattu and T20 captain Dinesh Chandimal.

Old Boys' Association
Sir D. B. Jayatilleke, the then principal, conceived the idea of the Ananda College Old Boys' Association in 1908. Initially, its main function was to organise a sports-meet and the annual dinner. In subsequent years the OBA and the school's administration have co-operated in furthering the development of the College. Prior to 1961 (when the school was nationalised), the incumbent principal of the school presided over the OBA. Since that date, a president is elected by members at each annual general meeting. The present president of OBA is Mr.Dushmantha Karannagoda.

Ananda Gallery
Ananda Gallery is the official Ananda College Merchandise portal. Ananda Gallery was established in December 2017 by Principal S.M. Keerthirathna.
2021

Ananda Daham Pasala

Ananda Daham Pasala (ආනන්ද දහම් පාසල/Ananda Dhamma School) is the Sunday school of Ananda College. It was started in 2004 as a project of the 81 group.

Notable alumni

Olcott oration
Olcott oration is an annual event organized by the old boys association of Ananda College, which commemorate the founder Colonel Henry Steel Olcott of Ananda College and other leading Buddhist schools in Sri Lanka. Every year famous personalities who educated at Ananda College, share their own experience for the "Olcott oration" and renowned dignitaries who have delivered the oration in the past, include Prof. Nimal Rajapakshe, Prof. Sumedha Chandana Wirasinghe and Prof. Ravindra Fernando.

College war memorial
The Ananda College war memorial is situated in front of the Henry Steel Olcott Hall and is dedicated to alumni of Ananda college who died while members of the Sri Lankan armed forces. Lieutenant A. P. N. C. De S. Vaas Gunawardene on 23 July 1983 became the first Anandian officer to sacrifice his life while in the Military. The plaque bears the names of old Anandians who were killed in the line of duty which includes the names of 45 war heroes from the Sri Lanka Army, and many more names of war heroes from the Sri Lanka Navy and the Sri Lanka Air Force. Ananda College OBA organises an annual "Ananda Viruharasara" event to honour the military dead.

Past Principals

Notable teachers 

 Balangoda Ananda Maitreya Thero 
 Sikkim Mahinda Thero
 Polwatte Buddhadatta Mahanayake Thera
 Gunapala Piyasena Malalasekera
 Chellappah Suntharalingam
 Lionel Ranwala
 Agampodi Paulus de Zoysa
 Tuan Burhanudeen Jayah
 R. A. Chandrasena
 D. W. J. Perera
 Sagara Palansuriya
 K. M. Rathnapala

References

External links 
 Ananda College - Official Website 

1886 establishments in Ceylon
Boys' schools in Sri Lanka
Buddhist schools in Sri Lanka
Educational institutions established in 1886
National schools in Sri Lanka
Schools in Colombo